Edward Mordake (sometimes spelled Mordrake) is the apocryphal subject of an urban legend who was born in the 19th century as the heir to an English peerage with a face at the back of his head. According to legend, the face could whisper, laugh or cry. Mordake repeatedly begged doctors to remove it, claiming it whispered bad things to him at night. Mordake committed suicide at the age of 23.

Description 
An account described Mordake's figure as one with "remarkable grace" and with a face similar to that of an Antinous. The second face on the back of Mordake's supposedly femalereportedly had a pair of eyes and a mouth that drooled. The duplicate face could not see, eat, or speak, but was said to "sneer while Mordake was happy" and "smile while Mordake was weeping". According to legend, Mordake repeatedly begged doctors to have his "demon face" removed, claiming that at night it whispered things that "one would only speak about in hell", but no doctor would attempt it. This then led to Mordake secluding himself in a room before deciding to take his own life at the age of 23.

An account of Mordake's story was detailed in Anomalies and Curiosities of Medicine:

Earliest reference
The first known description of Mordake is found in an 1895 article in The Boston Post authored by fiction writer Charles Lotin Hildreth. The article describes a number of cases of what Hildreth refers to as "human freaks", including a woman who had the tail of a fish, a man with the body of a spider, a man who was half-crab, and Edward Mordake. Hildreth claimed to have found these cases described in old reports of the "Royal Scientific Society". According to an article in USA Today, the only known "Royal Scientific Society" was founded in 1970 by Jordanian monarchs. Nothing could be found in the records of the similarly named Royal Society of London. Like many publications of the time, Hildreth's article was not factual, and was likely published by the newspaper to increase reader interest.

Anomalies and Curiosities of Medicine
The 1896 medical encyclopedia Anomalies and Curiosities of Medicine, co-authored by Dr. George M. Gould and Dr. David L. Pyle, included an account of Mordake. The account was copied directly from Hildreth's article, and was credited only to a "lay source". The encyclopedia described the basic morphology of Mordake's condition, but it provided no medical diagnosis for the rare deformity. An explanation for the birth defect may have been a form of craniopagus parasiticus (a parasitic twin head with an undeveloped body), a form of diprosopus (bifurcated craniofacial duplication), or an extreme form of parasitic twin (an unequal conjoined twin).

See also
Craniopagus parasiticus
Diprosopus
Futakuchi-onna
Janus
Polycephaly
Pasqual Piñón
Malignant (2021 film)

References

External links

 
 
 

Fictional English people
Fictional nobility
Fictional suicides
 Legendary creatures with supernumerary body parts
 Urban legends
 Parasitic twinning in culture